Saint Petersburg City Administration (Администрация Санкт-Петербурга) is the superior executive body of Saint Petersburg (formerly Leningrad), Russian Federation. It is located in a historic building, Smolny and known as the Government of Saint Petersburg (Правительство Санкт-Петербурга).

The head of the administration is the Governor of Saint Petersburg (Mayor of Saint Petersburg before 1996). In 1991 – 2006 the head of the city was elected by direct vote of the city residents. However, according to a Russian Federal Law accepted in 2004 (Full text in Russian), the governor was proposed by the President of the Russian Federation and approved (or disapproved) by the City Legislative Assembly until 2014, while in 2014 the governor was elected by popular vote of the city residents.

List of the heads of Leningrad / Saint Petersburg City Administration since 1991
 Anatoly Sobchak (Mayor, 1991 - 1996, elected in 1991, lost the elections in 1996)
 Vladimir Yakovlev (Governor, 1996 - 2003 (elected in 1996 and 2000, resigned in 2003 a year before the second term expiration, First deputy Mayor in 1994 - 1996)
 Alexander Beglov (acting Governor in June - October 2003) 
 Valentina Matviyenko (Governor, elected in 2003, proposed by the president and approved by the Legislative Assembly in 2006, resigned in 2011)
 Georgy Poltavchenko (proposed by the president and approved by the Legislative Assembly in August 2011)
See also List of heads of Saint Petersburg government.

Structure
The Administration consists of the Governor, the Government, The Governor's Chancellery, the city committees and the executive bodies of the districts subordinate to it.

Committees
Committee for City Improvement and Roads
Committee for External Relations and Tourism (Heads: Vladimir Putin (June 28 1991, – June 1996), Gennadiy Tkachyov (June 1996 – May 28 2002), Alexander Prokhorenko (since June 2002))
Committee for Housing Policy
Committee for the Press and Mass Media Cooperation (Heads: Dmitry Mezentsev (1991 - 1996), Alexander Potekhin (October 1997 - 2001), Irina Potekhina (2001 – October 2003), Alla Manilova (since October 17 2003))
Committee for Science and Higher Education
Committee for Public Health
Committee for Transport
Committee for Labor and Social Security
Committee for Economic Development, Industrial Policy and Trade (in March 1993 merged with the Committee for Finances into Committee for Economy and Finances headed by Alexei Kudrin, in July 1996 separated again, Heads: Dmitri Sergeyev (1992 - March 1993, July 1996 - 1997), Ilya Klebanov (December 1997 – May 31 1999), Anatoly Aleksashin (June 21 1999, – July2001), Sergey Vetlugin (July 2001 – October 2003), Vladimir Blank (October 2003 - June 2006), Aleksei Sergeyev (since June 27 2006))
Committee for Energetic and Engineering Support
Committee for State Control, Utilization and Protection of Historical and Cultural Landmarks
Committee for City Planning and Architecture (Heads: Oleg Kharchenko (1991 – June 15 2004), Aleksandr Viktorov (since June 15 2004))
Committee for Youth policy and Social organizations Interaction
Committee for Construction (Heads: Viktor Loktionov (until May 26 2000), Alexander Vakhmistrov (May 26 2000, – November 2003), Yevgeny Yatsishin (November 2003 – February 2 2005), Roman Filimonov (since February 2 2005))
Committee for Education
Committee for Culture
Committee for City Property Management (formed on September 10 1991, heads: Alexander Utevsky (October 1990 - December 12 1991), Sergey Belyaev (December 12 1991, - October 22 1993), Mikhail Manevich (October 23 1993, - August 18 1997, murdered by a sniper), German Gref (August 18 1997, - August 13 1998), Andrey Likhachyov (August 14 1998, - October 4 1999), Valery Nazarov (October 11 1999, - November 10 2003), Igor Mikhaylovich (since November 11 2003))
Committee for Physical Culture and Sports(Head: Yuri Avdeyev)
Committee for Finances (in March 1993 merged with the Committee for Economic Development into Committee for Economy and Finances headed by Alexei Kudrin, in July 1996 separated again, Heads: Alexei Kudrin (1992 - March 1993), Igor Artemyev (July 1996 – January 1999), Viktor Krotov (January 1999 – November 2003), Alexander Nikonov (since November 24 2003))
State Technical Administrative Inspection
State Housing Inspection
Committee for Justice, Legal Order, and Safety
Committee for Land Resources and Land Development
Committee for Investments and Strategic Projects (founded in 2003, heads: Andrey Mikhaylenko (December 9 2003, - June 2004), Maxim Sokolov (since June 29 2004))
Informatization and Communication Committee
Committee for Use of Natural Resources, Environment Protection, and Environmental Safety
Saint Petersburg Licensing Chamber
Saint Petersburg Regional Power Commission
Veterinary Department
Saint Petersburg State Construction Supervision and Expertise Department
Civil Registration Department
Saint Petersburg Flood Control Facilities Construction Department
Committee for Executive powers of the government development and Interaction with the local autonomous bodies
Committee on transport-transit policy
Appeals and Complaints Department
Hotels services Department of the Administration of St.Petersburg
Information Department – Press-service of the Governor’s Administration of St.Petersburg
Committee on Financial control of St.Petersburg
St.Petersburg and Leningrad Region Archival Committee
Gardening and Market-gardening Development Department
St.Petersburg and Leningrad region Central Administrative Board of Internal Affairs

Saint Petersburg District Administrations
Admiralteysky District Administration 
Vasileostrovsky District Administration 
Vyborgsky District Administration 
Kalininsky District Administration 
Kirovsky District Administration 
Kolpinsky District Administration 
Krasnogvardeysky Administration 
Krasnoselsky District Administration (Head: Evgeny Nikolskiy)
Kronshtadtsky District Administration 
Kurortny District Administration 
Moskovsky District Administration 
Nevsky District Administration 
Petrogradsky District Administration 
Petrodvortsovy District Administration 
Primorsky District Administration 
Pushkinsky District Administration 
Frunzunsky District Administration 
Tsentralny District Administration

Government
The Government of Saint Petersburg is headed by the governor and includes also vice-governors, the head of the Committee for City Improvement and Roads, the head of the Committee for Press and Mass Media Cooperation, the head of the Committee for Economic Development, Industrial Policy and Trade, the envoy of the governor to the Saint Petersburg Legislative Assembly, the head of the Tsentralny District Administration and the Chief of the Main Directorate for Internal Affairs of Saint Petersburg and Leningrad Oblast.

Vice-Governors
Igor Divinsky (Vice-Governor; State administrative and technical inspections; Head of Gostekhnadzor - State inspection of St. Petersburg to oversee the technical state of self-propelled vehicles and other equipment)
Alexander Govorunov (Vice-Governor; Head of The Governor's Chancellery)
Olga Kazanskaya (for Health)
Igor Albin (for Construction, Transportation and Ecology)
Vladimir Kirillov (for Science, Culture and Education) 
Nikolai Bondarenko (for Housing policy)
Oleg Markov (for Tourism, Communications and External Relations)
Sergei Movchan (for Industry, support small business and Innovations)
Mikhail Mokretsov (for Economy, Investment and Federal and City Property Management)
Mikhail Brodsky (Governor's representative in the Legislative Assembly)

Former Vice-Governors:
Anatoly Kagan (for Public Health)
Oleg Virolaynen (2003 - 2006, for City Improvement)
Anna Markova (2002 - 2003, for Justice)
Alexander Potekhin (1997 - 2001, for Mass Media and Public Relations)
Irina Potekhina (2001 - 2003, for Mass Media and Public Relations)
Valeri Malyshev (2001 - 2003, for City Improvement)
Konstantin Kondakov (2002 - 2003, for City Improvement)
Gennady Tkachyov (1996 - 2002)
Alexander Prokhorenko (2002 - 2003, for External Relations)
Sergey Vetlugin (2001 - 2003, for Economy)
Mikhail Manevich (1996 - 1997, for City Property Management)
Vladimir Derbin (2000 - 2003, for Welfare)
Alexander Beglov (first Vice-Governor, 2002-2003)
Vladimir Petrovich Yakovlev (1993 - 2000, for Culture)
Yury Antonov (1998 - 2002, for Energy)
Vladimir Shitarev (2000 - 2003, for Culture)
Igor Artemyev (1996 - 1999, First Vice-Governor)
Dmitry Kozak (1998 - 1999)
Viktor Loktionov (1996 - 2000, for Construction)
Andrey Likhachyov (1998 - 1999, for City Property Management)
Andrey Chernenko (2003 - 2004, for Justice)
Vladimir Grishanov (1998 - 2003, Chief of Staff)
Vyacheslav Shcherbakov (until 2000, for Welfare)
Viktor Krotov (for Finances)
Ilya Klebanov
German Gref (1997 - 1998, for City Property Management)
Viktor Lobko (until 2014, Chief of Staff of the Governor)
Mikhail Oseevsky (until 2012, for Economy)
Lyudmila Kostkina (for Welfare, until 2014)
Sergey Tarasov (for Science, Culture and Education) 
 Alexander Vakhmistrov (for construction)
Valery Tikhonov (for Justice, Communications and External Relations)
Yury Molchanov  (for Investment and Federal and City Property Management)
Alexander Polukeyev (for City Improvement, since 2006)

External links
Official site (broken link sept 2020)

Government of Saint Petersburg